Joshua Iniyezo (born 8 November 1988), better known by his stage name SolidStar Isoko or simply SolidStar, is a Nigerian singer. He began his musical career as a drummer for a local church in his hometown of Delta State. SolidStar is popularly known across Nigeria and Africa for his hit song "One in a Million". He got signed by Ossy Achievas.

In 2010, he released his debut album One in a Million which went on to become a huge hit. The remix of the single "One in a Million" there after featuring Africa's legend 2face Idibia. He has followed up this feat with several hit singles later on down the line.

Early life 

SolidStar, who is known for his ability to sing fluently in English, Isoko and Igbo, was born in Delta State, Nigeria, to Mr. and Mrs. Iniyezo. His family originated from Aviara town. SolidStar began his music career at the age of 14 when he started playing the drums for his church choir in Aviara. He was discovered a few years later at a music talent show in Ajegunle area of Lagos State where he was introduced to Paul Cole a record label boss. In 2010, SolidStar formally signs to Achievas Record and his debut album was subsequently released under the label.

Career 
In 2010, SolidStar released his debut album One in a Million through Achievas Music. The album was a hit fueled by its lead single "One in a Million", which was a collaboration with 2face Idibia.

Discography

Albums 
Grace$GloryW.E.E.D
One in a Million
Solidstar

Selected singles 
"One in a Million" (featuring 2Baba)
"Silicon" (featuring Timaya)
"International Woman"
"Nwa Baby" (featuring 2Baba)
"Wait (Refix)" (featuring Patoranking and Tiwa Savage)
"Wait" (featuring Davido)
"My Body (featuring Timaya)
"Negotiate"
"Oluchi" (featuring Flavour)
"Skibo"
"Omotena"
"Yarinya"
"Ala"

Videography

Awards and nominations

References

External links 
 

Living people
1988 births
Musicians from Delta State
Nigerian male singer-songwriters
Nigerian drummers
Nigerian hip hop singers
Afrobeat musicians
21st-century drummers
21st-century Nigerian  male singers